Tercel may refer to:

Tercel, the traditional term for a male falcon
Toyota Tercel, a car manufactured from 1978 to 1999
Trendak Tercel, a Polish autogyro
USS Tercel (AM-386), a United States Navy minesweeper